2nd Independent Division of Zhejiang Provincial Military District was formed in September 1966 from the Public Security Contingent of Zhejiang province. The division was composed of three regiments (5th to 7th).

From September 1967 to November 1969 the division was transferred to 20th Army Corps. After that the division was returned to Zhejiang Provincial Military District's control.

The division was disbanded in May 1976.

References

IZ2
Military units and formations established in 1966
Military units and formations disestablished in 1976